Marie-France Loval (born 12 August 1964 in Pointe-à-Pitre, Guadeloupe) is a French track and field athlete, who specialises in the 100 meters. Loval competed in the women's 100 meters and the 4 × 100 m relay at the 1984 Summer Olympics.

External links
 

French female sprinters
Olympic athletes of France
Guadeloupean female sprinters
French people of Guadeloupean descent
Athletes (track and field) at the 1984 Summer Olympics
1964 births
Living people
Mediterranean Games gold medalists for France
Mediterranean Games medalists in athletics
Athletes (track and field) at the 1983 Mediterranean Games
Olympic female sprinters